Tangerine Dream have scored over 50 film, television and video game soundtracks. Just over half of the scores have had official releases, with more released on the Tangerine Tree fan project.

References

Musical group filmographies
Tangerine Dream soundtracks